Birley is an electoral ward in the city of Sheffield, England.

Birley may also refer to:

Birley (surname), a common English surname, includes a list of people named Birley
Birley Collieries, coal mines in Sheffield, England
Birley Community College, a secondary school and technology college in Birley, Sheffield
Birley Spa, a community bath hall in Sheffield, England
Birley with Upper Hill, a civil parish in Herefordshire, England

See also
 
 Burley (disambiguation)
 Burghley (disambiguation)
 Burleigh (disambiguation)
 Berlei